Tianwan Nuclear Power Plant is a nuclear power plant (NPP) in the city of Lianyungang in Jiangsu Province, China. 
It is located on the coast of the Yellow Sea approximately 30 kilometers east of Lianyungang proper. It is co-owned by Jiangsu Nuclear Power Corporation, a joint venture partially owned by the China National Nuclear Corporation (CNNC), and Atomstroyexport (ASE), the nuclear equipment exporter branch of the Russian nuclear corporation Rosatom.
 
The NPP consists of four reactor units each rated at 1,000 MW capacity and constructed by ASE, two more units rated at 1,000 MW capacity constructed by CNNC and another two units rated at 1,200 MW capacity under construction under ASE. If all the units are completed, Tianwan will become the world's largest nuclear power plant with a total generating capacity of about 8,100 MWe, surpassing both the active Kori NPP (7,411 MWe) and the inactive Kashiwazaki-Kariwa NPP (7,965 MWe).

History

Units 1 and 2 
Construction commenced on 20 October 1999 for the first unit, and on 20 October 2000 for the second reactor unit. The first reactor went critical on 20 December 2005. Construction of the second reactor finished in May 2007 and commercial operation began in August. This is the first time the two countries have cooperated on a nuclear power project.

Units 3 and 4 
On 23 November 2010, Jiangsu Nuclear Power Corporation signed a contract with ASE according to which ASE will supply 1060 MWe VVER-1000 reactors for units 3 and 4.
Construction of unit 3 was delayed by the 2011 Fukushima nuclear disaster in Japan, but finally began on 27 December 2012. Construction of unit 4 would follow up about a year later, on 27 September 2013. Unit 3 finished construction and went critical in late December 2017 and started commercial operation a few months later in early 2018, while Unit 4 went critical in late September 2018 and finished construction a month later in October. It started commercial operation in late December 2018. Initially, units 3 and 4 are owned by ASE, but on 20 January 2020, ASE transferred control of unit 3 to Jiangsu Nuclear Power Corporation.

Units 5 and 6 
On 27 December 2015 and 7 September 2016, CNNC started construction of Units 5 and 6 with their own 1,000 MW ACPR-1000 reactors. Fuel loading for Tianwan unit 5 was completed on 13 July 2020, criticality was achieved on 30 July 2020, grid connection was established on 8 August 2020, and commercial operation started on 8 September 2020. Unit 6 reached commercial operation on 3 June 2021.

Units 7 and 8 
China National Nuclear Corporation (CNNC) and ASE signed the detailed contract for the construction of two VVER-1200s (Tianwan 7 and 8) on 7 March 2019. Construction of Tianwan 7 started on 19 May 2021 and Tianwan 8 began on 25 February 2022 Commercial operation is expected in 2026 and 2027.

Details

Both units use VVER pressurized water reactor (PWR) technology supplied from Russia. Together they cost approximately US$3.3 billion.  The units are the Russian standard reactor type VVER-1000/392 (also carries the designation of VVER-1000/428) adapted specifically for China.

These VVER 1000 reactors are housed in a confinement shell capable of being hit by an aircraft weighing 20 tonnes and suffering no expected damage. Reactors also received additional protection from earthquakes. Other important safety features include an emergency core cooling system and core confinement system. Russia delivered initial fuel loads for the Tianwan reactors. China planned to begin indigenous fuel fabrication for the Tianwan plant in 2010, using technology transferred from Russian nuclear fuel producer TVEL.

"The station has four levels of security. There's a double asbestos cluster, which blocks any kind of emissions. Also there's a revolutionary security improvement called the trap, which prevents any leakage of nuclear fuel in the event of a breakdown", Alexandr Selikhov, Head of Atomstroyexport's delegation to China

The Tianwan Nuclear Power Plant uses third party parts. While the reactor and turbo-generators are of Russian design, the control room was designed and built by an international consortium (including Siemens). In this way the plant was brought to meet the toughest recognised safety standards; safety systems were already mostly in place but the previous monitoring of these systems did not meet international safety standards. The new VVER 1000 plant built in China has 94% of its systems automated, meaning the plant can control itself under most situations. Refueling procedures require little human intervention. Five operators are still needed in the control room.

Reactors 
The Tianwan nuclear power plant has six operating units, one under construction, and one more planned future reactor:

See also
List of nuclear reactors#China
Nuclear power in China

References

External links

Nuclear power stations in China
Nuclear power stations using VVER reactors
Buildings and structures in Lianyungang
Energy infrastructure completed in 2006
Nuclear power stations with reactors under construction
Nuclear power stations with proposed reactors